Open Primaries is an American 501(c)(4) and 501(c)(3)  advocacy organization. Its headquarters are in New York City.

The group advocates for open primaries in the United States with a focus on the nonpartisan blanket primary. The group supported a successful ballot initiative in Colorado that created an open primary system in 2016.

The group also publishes research on the benefits of public, nonpartisan primaries, as well as the harmful effects of closed primaries. During the 2016 presidential primary, the group declared that closed presidential primaries cost taxpayers roughly $287.8 million to administer, and that 26.3 million voters were locked out of the primary due to their unaffiliated or independent voter status.

Staff 
 John Opdycke, President
 Jeremy Gruber, Senior Vice President
 Jesse Shayne, Digital Director
 Jason Olson, Director of National Outreach
Dariel Cruz Rodriguez, Co-Director of Students for Open Primaries

References

External links
Official website
Electoral reform in the United States
501(c)(4) nonprofit organizations